The Universidad Europea de Canarias (in english: European University of the Canary Islands) also known as the UEC, is the first private higher education institution in the Canary Islands (Spain). It began its activity in October 2012, having its headquarters in the municipality of La Orotava (Tenerife). The university is integrated into the Laureate International Universities network.

Teaching 
The university started its career in 2012 offering five degrees: (Business Management and Creation, Marketing and Business Management, International Management of Tourism and Leisure Companies, Advertising Communication, and Fundamentals of Architecture) and three Masters (MBA-Master in Business Administration, Renewable Energies, and Emergencies, Emergencies and Critical Nursing).

See also 
 University of La Laguna

References

External links
European University of the Canary Islands

Private universities and colleges in Spain
Educational institutions established in 2012
Education in the Canary Islands
Organisations based in the Canary Islands
2012 establishments in Spain
Buildings and structures in the Province of Santa Cruz de Tenerife